No Doubt is the fifteenth studio album of the Christian rock band, Petra. It was released on August 26, 1995.

The tone of the album is more pop-oriented than any previous release featuring Schlitt. Most of the rock songs lack the driving edge of their previous albums, and the sonic field is no longer flooded with distorted guitars, leaning more toward a calculated, radio-friendly sound.

All the guitars in the album were played by founder Bob Hartman. However, since he had quit touring with the band before the release of the album, new guitarist David Lichens was enlisted to travel with the band and appeared in the album art and promotional pictures.

The album also featured another new member, keyboardist Jim Cooper. Cooper was a keyboard technician for former keyboardist John Lawry for several years. When Lawry retired, Cooper replaced him.

Track listing 
All songs written by Bob Hartman, except where noted.
 "Enter In" – 5:00
 "Think Twice" – 4:19
 "Heart of a Hero" (words by Brian Wooten) – 4:10
 "More Than a Thousand Words" – 4:58
 "No Doubt" – 4:54
 "Right Place" – 3:38
 "Two Are Better Than One" – 3:43
 "Sincerely Yours" – 4:16
 "Think on These Things" – 4:24
 "For All You're Worth" (words by Jim Cooper) – 4:14
 "We Hold Our Hearts Out to You" – 4:11

Awards 
 Nominated for Grammy Award for Best Rock Gospel Album in 1995.
 Won Dove Award for Rock Album in 1996.

Personnel 
Petra
 John Schlitt – lead vocals, background vocals 
 Jim Cooper – keyboards, background vocals 
 David Lichens – lead guitars
 Ronny Cates – bass, background vocals 
 Louie Weaver – drums

Additional musicians
 John Elefante – additional keyboards, string arrangements 
 Bob Hartman – all guitars
 Tom Howard – string arrangements and conductor 
 The Nashville String Machine – strings
 Chris Rodriguez – background vocals
 Micah Wilshire – background vocals

Production
 John Elefante – producer, engineer at The Sound Kitchen, Franklin, Tennessee
 Dino Elefante – producer, engineer at The Sound Kitchen
 Bob Hartman – executive producer
 Lynn Keesecker – A&R direction 
 Bubba Smith – A&R direction 
 David Murphy – string recording at Great Circle Sound, Nashville, Tennessee
 Steve Marcantonio – mixing (1-4, 6, 7, 9)
 Terry Christian – mixing (5, 8, 10, 11)
 Hank Williams – mastering at MasterMix, Nashville, Tennessee
 P.J. Marx – guitar technician 
 Chuck Nelson – art direction 
 Lyndie Wenner – art direction 
 Chris Ferrara – design
 Ben Pearson – photography

Notes 

1995 albums
Petra (band) albums